Shishkabugs is a 1962 Warner Bros. Looney Tunes animated short directed by Friz Freleng. The short was released on December 8, 1962, and stars Bugs Bunny and Yosemite Sam. The title of the short is a play on shish kebab, a culinary dish.

With only 5 minutes and 05 seconds of footage (not counting the credits and cards), Shishkabugs is the shortest Bugs Bunny short ever made in the Golden Age of American animation. Shishkabugs is also a rare cartoon where Yosemite Sam is in the role of a victim instead of being the aggressor.

Plot
Yosemite Sam is the royal chef for a king; Sam is in a bad temper for not only does he have to buy food and cook every day but his employer is a spoiled king who shouts at him "Where's my lunch? Where's my dinner?" After Sam prepares the king's latest meal, the king orders Sam to fix him some hasenpfeffer.
Sam doesn't know what this new dish is and the King throws a custard dish into Sam's face. While Sam is looking up the recipe, Bugs Bunny knocks on the door and explains that he's come to borrow a cup of diced carrots. Sam tricks Bugs into thinking that the king has invited Bugs for dinner. Bugs demurs, saying that he is not prepared; but Sam assures Bugs that he will "prepare" him.

Realizing there's no time to cook Bugs, Sam shuts him in the pot and serves him to the eager king. Bugs gives the King a kiss.  The angry king orders Sam to take the raw Hasenpfeffer back to the kitchen and prepare it the right way, or else Sam will be "drawn and quartered". Sam shoves Bugs into the oven and demands that he stay there until the cooking time is up. Bugs escapes the oven and leaves.  When the king lifts the pot lid, a spring loaded custard pie springs out and hits the king in the face. Sam realizes that his goose has just been cooked. A pair of clumsy guards rush in, arrest Sam, and lead him to the dungeon to await execution.

Bugs, now the new royal chef, serves the king a giant carrot and calls it hasenpfeffer. The king comments, "If I didn't know this was hasenpfeffer, I'd swear it was carrots." Bugs breaks the fourth wall and closing one eye remarks: "It just goes to show ya that a one-eyed jack rabbit can beat a king!"

See also
 List of Bugs Bunny cartoons
 List of Yosemite Sam cartoons

References

External links

1962 films
1962 animated films
1962 short films
1960s American animated films
1960s Warner Bros. animated short films
Looney Tunes shorts
Short films directed by Friz Freleng
Films scored by William Lava
Bugs Bunny films
Films about royalty
Yosemite Sam films
1960s English-language films
Films about chefs